Since late 2021, the prices for many essential goods in the United Kingdom began increasing faster than household incomes, resulting in a fall in real incomes. This is caused in part by a rise in inflation in the UK, as well as the economic impact of issues such as the COVID-19 pandemic, Russia's invasion of Ukraine and Brexit. While all in the UK are affected by rising prices, it most substantially affects low-income persons. The British government has responded in various ways, such as by making provision for a £650 grant for households in receipt of means-tested benefits, a £150 council tax rebate, and implementing an Energy Price Guarantee.

Definition 
The Big Issue newspaper defines a cost-of-living crisis as "a scenario in which the cost of everyday essentials like energy and food is rising much faster than average incomes". The think-tank Institute for Government defines the UK's cost-of-living crisis as "the fall in real disposable incomes (that is, adjusted for inflation and after taxes and benefits) that the UK has experienced since late 2021".

Causes 

Both global and local factors have contributed to the UK's cost-of-living crisis. According to Bank of England governor Andrew Bailey, about 80% of the causes driving the cost-of-living crisis are global. These include the various forms of instability the world has experienced in the early 2020s such as the COVID-19 pandemic, a chip shortage, an energy crisis, a supply chain crisis, and Russia's invasion of Ukraine. The UK was reported to be among the worst affected among the world's advanced economies. In 2021, the UK's inflation was less than that of the US, but high US inflation was not generally experienced as a cost-of-living crisis due to the stimulus cheques that had been distributed to American households. Though in 2022 the cost-of-living crisis was also reported as being a global phenomenon, having impacts that include those living in the US, across Europe, and as risking an "apocalyptic" impact for those in the developing world. 

Causes unique to the UK include labour shortages related to foreign workers leaving due to Brexit, and additional taxes on households. Factors that have worsened the crisis since 1 April 2022 include Ofgem increasing the household energy price cap by 54%, an increase in National Insurance, and a rise in Council Tax.  Researchers in the Centre for Economic Performance at the London School of Economics investigated trade flows and consumer prices of food products in the UK and found Brexit increased food prices due to increased red tape when food is imported from Europe.  This affected poorer households disproportionately.  Unemployed people in the UK receive lower fiscal support than the average for OECD countries, and UK salaries have not risen substantially since the financial crisis of 2007–2008. Insufficient long-term gas storage facilities resulted in the UK energy prices being overexposed to the market fluctuations. Household income, whether from wages or benefits, have not generally kept pace with rising prices. In April 2022, UK real wages fell by 4.5%, the sharpest fall since records began back in 2001. By July 2022, inflation had risen to over 10%, the highest level in 40 years, and the Bank of England was forecasting it could reach 13% by the end of the year. Energy costs for the typical British household were expected to rise 80% from October 2022, from £1,971 to £3,549, until Liz Truss, who was Prime Minister at the time, announced measures to limit these increases.

On 23 September 2022, UK Chancellor Kwasi Kwarteng announced his September 2022 United Kingdom mini-budget, backed by Truss, which included widespread tax cuts. This economically right-wing package included cuts to stamp duty, removing the cap on bankers' bonuses and the abolishment of the 45% rate of income tax for those earning £150,000 or more a year. These cuts aimed to encourage foreign investment and economic growth but were not costed and spooked financial markets. This caused the pound to fall to a low of $1.03, and government borrowing costs increased significantly. The Bank of England reacted by raising interest rates, causing mortgage payments to increase significantly as well as affecting many people's pensions and savings. By late October, Truss and Kwarteng had been replaced by Rishi Sunak and Jeremy Hunt, and all of the mini budget's proposals had effectively been cancelled. The pound regained some strength by this point, but interest rates remained high, stretching household incomes.

Effects and timeline 
Based on an Office for National Statistics (ONS) survey performed between 27 April and 22 May 2022, 77% of UK adults reported feeling worried about the rising cost of living, with 50% saying they worried "nearly every day". A separate ONS survey taken from 25 May to 5 June found 52% of respondents had cut back on their energy use. While rising prices have affected all social classes, the poor have been impacted the most. According to a survey by the Food Foundation think tank published in February 2022, one million UK adults went a whole day without eating over the past month. Inflation began rising sharply in 2021, affecting a wide range of goods and services. Transport costs have been especially affected, but also many others, including costs for food, furniture, household items, electricity and clothing. The Financial Times reported in May 2022 that the crisis caused UK consumer confidence to fall to its lowest level since 1974. In June, charities had reported the crisis is affecting people's mental health, with one publishing a survey where 9% of responding parents had said their children had begun self-harming.

On 10 November, nurses and other medical personnel across the NHS voted to strike, under the Royal College of Nursing. The nurses stated this was due to failing wages, inflation, overwork, and underfunding. The industrial action affects NHS hospitals throughout the UK. Nurses are still expected to work certain days at reduced-capacity to ensure the NHS is still operational.

The Office for National Statistics stated on 11 November that business investment fell during the three months to September and was below the pre-pandemic levels.  Gross domestic product fell during the three months to September due to a decline in manufacturing "across most industries" according to the ONS.

On 8 December 2022 The Guardian reported that according to research by the Joseph Rowntree Foundation, over 3 million UK low-income households could not afford to heat their homes. According to the research by the foundation, roughly 710,000 households had difficulty paying for food, heating and warm clothing. The foundation urged the government to increase universal credit. A government spokesperson said that the support of the most vulnerable remains a priority and that millions of the most needy people are being given at least £1200 in direct payments to protect them against rising prices in addition to the £400 being given to each household towards energy costs. They said that the support also includes a winter energy price guarantee worth approximately £900 for a typical household and a household support fund to help people with essential costs and that the chancellor had announced further efforts to support those most in need next year.  The Joseph Rowntree Foundation said their research showed that hundreds of thousands of households could not afford to protect themselves from cold and that prices of essentials were rising steeply with energy bills and were nearly double the level the previous winter. A briefing from the Department of Health and Social Care (DHSC), detailing the plans they have made to take on thousands of volunteers to counteract staff shortfalls during the 2022/23 winter, included a warnings about the impact on hospital admissions that the cold weather, increased fuel prices, and cost of living might have, especially for the elderly.

Responses

Government 

Early government responses to rising inflation included a 6.6% rise in the minimum wage, which was announced in 2021, and came into effect in April 2022. The UK government intensified its efforts to respond to the cost-of-living crisis in May 2022, with a £5bn windfall tax on energy companies to help fund a £15bn support package for the public. The package included every household getting a £400 discount on energy bills, which would be in addition to a £150 council tax refund the government had already ordered. For about 8 million of the UK's lowest income households, a further £650 payment was announced. Additionally, pensioners or those with disability would qualify for extra payments, on top of the £550 that every household gets, and the £650 they would receive if they had a low income. 

In June 2022, business secretary Kwasi Kwarteng ordered an urgent review of the motor fuel market to complete by 7 July, to see if consumer prices were excessively high. The measures were called insufficient by many people and organisations, including outgoing Prime Minister Boris Johnson, with the Bank of England predicting that the UK would enter recession by 2023.

Johnson's successor Liz Truss announced a package of subsidies for rising energy bills with an estimated potential cost of up to £150billion, depending on future wholesale prices. The main piece of this package was the Energy Price Guarantee, which would mean that a UK household with "average energy usage" would pay no more than £2,500 a year on energy, although this was widely misinterpreted as Truss stated in media interviews that "nobody would pay more than £2,500". She later clarified this, while ruling out introducing a new windfall tax on the profits of energy producers and suppliers. The subsidies were initially planned to last for two years for consumers and six months for businesses, but in October the new Chancellor Jeremy Hunt said that the package would continue until April 2023 and that from this date support would be targeted at "the most vulnerable." 

After his appointment as prime minister in October 2022 following Truss' resignation, Rishi Sunak continued the package of subsidies for rising energy bills. As chancellor, he provided some funding to help vulnerable people cope with the rising cost of living.

In October 2022, the Scottish Government introduced an act to freeze rents and establish a moratorium on evictions in Scotland for both the private rented and social sectors.

Civil society groups 
Various campaigns, such as Don't Pay UK, were established to encourage the government to implement further assistance.

Anti-hunger campaigner Jack Monroe warned that the crisis could be fatal for some of the children of low-income parents, and asked the government to increase benefits in line with inflation. UK civil society continues to respond to the hardship caused by the cost-of-living crisis, such as by running foodbanks, though some foodbank managers report both extra demand but also lower levels of donations, as the crisis means some people who could previously donate can no longer afford to do so. On 18 June 2022, thousands of workers marched to Parliament in London to demand further government action for the cost-of-living crisis.

A campaign called "Enough is Enough" was organized by trade union leaders to fight the cost-of-living crisis. Its demands include a return to pre-April 2022 energy rates, a pay rise in real terms for public sector workers, a rise in the national minimum wage, a reversal of the National Insurance increase, and a £20 per week increase in Universal Credit payments. Within a few weeks of its August 2022 launch, almost 450,000 people had joined the movement. It gained some high profile supporters, including the Mayor of Greater Manchester Andy Burnham and US Senator Bernie Sanders.

Media response 
The cost-of-living crisis has been noted by the media, as well as workers' unions, as one of the reasons for industrial action by staff in industries such as the railway strikes, bus strikes and action by Legal Aid lawyers. In September 2022, the BBC soap opera Doctors began covering the topic in a long-running issue-led storyline featuring Scarlett Kiernan (Kia Pegg) and her father struggling to survive.

See also 

 2021–2023 inflation surge
 Don't Pay UK
 Economic impact of the 2022 Russian invasion of Ukraine
 Economic impact of the COVID-19 pandemic in the United Kingdom
 Fuel poverty in the United Kingdom
 Hunger in the United Kingdom
 Income in the United Kingdom
 Retail Price Index
 United Kingdom government austerity programme
 Universal basic income in the United Kingdom

Notes and references

Further reading 
 
 

2021 in the United Kingdom
2022 in the United Kingdom
2023 in the United Kingdom
2020s in the United Kingdom
2020s in British politics
Consequences of Brexit
Economic crises in Europe
Economic history of the United Kingdom
Economic impact of the COVID-19 pandemic
Inflation in the United Kingdom
Personal finance
Poverty in the United Kingdom
Social history of the United Kingdom
Impact of the COVID-19 pandemic in the United Kingdom
Events affected by the 2022 Russian invasion of Ukraine
Boris Johnson
Liz Truss
Rishi Sunak